Saborsko is a village and municipality in Karlovac County, Croatia. The municipality is part of the Lika region.

Geography 
It is country-side mountain resort, situated in a curved, long and narrow valley. The altitude of the place is 630–900 m. 1 / 4 of the Saborsko is located in National Park Plitvice Lakes.

Demographics 
In the 2011 census, the total municipality population was 632, in the following settlements:
 Begovac, population 16
 Blata, population 54
 Lička Jesenica, population 100
 Saborsko, population 462

In the 2001 census, the municipality of Saborsko had 860 inhabitants, of whom 78.5% (675) were Croats and 19.19% (165) were ethnic Serbs.

Saborsko inhabited place:
 2001 - 666
 1991 - 852 (Croats - 800 Serbs - 18, other - 34)
 1981 - 1127 (Croats - 1081, Serbs - 38, Yugoslavs - 4, others - 4)
 1971 - 1,519 (Croats - 1476, Serbs - 34, Yugoslavs - 1, other - 8)
 1961 - 1832
 1951 - 2062
 1948 - 2165

History 
Saborsko is first mentioned in the Modruš Feudal Law in 1486.

In World War II, the Chetniks killed 48 civilians in Saborsko, including seven boys and girls. 

In the Croatian War of Independence, Croatian troops defended Saborsko for several months until falling in November 1991, after the JNA and nearly 1000 members of paramilitary groups broke the defences, armed with nine military aircraft, 43 tanks, howitzers and a dozen MRL's. The assault destroyed several homes and the Parish Church. The Yugoslav forces executed the Saborsko massacre, in which 29 civilians were killed. A total of 48 citizens of Saborsko were killed in 1991.

The rate at which refugees returned after the war was slow, due to the lack of housing, jobs, and the danger of mines. At first, only the elderly people returned. The Croatian Government began the rebuilding of family homes and common buildings, including the Parish Church. Even so, few families have returned, especially those with children.

Nature 
The richness and beauty of Saborsko is most evident in the virgin forest mountain nature. The area abounds with mountain streams, lakes, dense forests and unspoiled countless species of wildlife. To be preserved further, many areas of the municipality Saborsko are protected.

 Mala Kapela mountain
 Lake Blata
 River Jesenica

Protected areas

 Part of the National Park Plitvice Lakes
 Čorkova uvala

Monuments and landmarks 

 The old parish church from 1726, worldwide cultural heritage monument.
 The parish church of St. John Nepomuk built in 2001
 Monument to the fallen Croatian soldiers

References

External links 

 Saborsko.net

Municipalities of Croatia
Populated places in Karlovac County